Emmanuel Gomez was a  Luso-African from Bissau who founded a Luso-African dynasty in Bakia, Guinea in the eighteenth century. He was the father of Emmanuel Gomez, junior and Niara Bely.

References

People from Bissau
Guinean people
African slave traders
18th-century African businesspeople